Valsavarenche (known as Valsavara under fascist rule from 1939 to 1946, and as Valsavaranche from 1946 to 1976) is a comune  in the Aosta Valley, northern Italy. It is part of the Unité des communes valdôtaines du Grand-Paradis.

See also 
 Mont Tout Blanc

References

Cities and towns in Aosta Valley